Lake Albert is an artificial lake in the suburb of Lake Albert in Wagga Wagga in New South Wales, Australia. Covering 125 ha, the lake was built in 1868 on what was known as Swampy Plains and was named after Prince Albert.

Surrounded by parkland, the lake is a venue for water sports, fishing, walking and bird watching. The lake is home to the Boat Club and one of the city's two golf courses, Wagga Wagga Country Club, is situated on the western shore of the lake.

History

Events

On 8–9 May 1976, the Water Ski Challenge Shield was held on the lake for the first time which was formed by Zone 5 of the New South Wales Ski Association and the Wagga Boat Club. On 9 May 1976, Australian Ski and Victorian trial champion, Barry Carne from the Melbourne suburb of Lower Templestowe, died when he collapsed and cart wheeled up to twelve times during the sixth lap of the final heat of the ski challenge.

The Barry Carne Memorial Ski Race was held on the second Saturday and Sunday in May of each year, subject to water levels in the lake. On 13 and 14 May 2006 the event returned to Lake Albert after a 4-year absence due to the lake being at record low levels owing to drought but was cancelled in 2007 due to low water levels.

On 12 May 2009, due to the low water levels in the lake the Barry Carne High and Dry event was held. In March 2010 it was announced that Barry Carne Memorial Ski Race would return to the lake on 3rd Saturday and Sunday in May, after record breaking rain had filled that lake.

Water levels
Due to years of drought the water level at Lake Albert reached record lows and in 2005 Wagga Wagga City Council considered pumping water into the lake to prevent further fish deaths which was ruled out by a senior council official.

In January 2007, a ban on water sport activities on Lake Albert was likely if the lake's water level drops below  due to the ongoing drought.

On 20 March 2008, the lake was closed for the second time since January 2008 due to high levels of Faecal Coliforms in the water.

In January 2010, the lake's water levels were at record lows with a large amount of fish, mostly European carp, dying due to the low water levels, blue-green algae and hot weather. With the low water levels and dying fish, residents around the lake fear that a mosquitoes outbreak is possible which could see an outbreak of the Ross River fever.

Silt removal

References

External links 

 Lake Albert
 History of Lake Albert - Wagga Wagga Boat Club

Albert
Wagga Wagga